GLOW is an international organization to further the study of generative grammar, founded in 1977 and based in the Netherlands. Its activities include its annual spring linguistics conference and periodic summer schools. In the past, GLOW published a newsletter that discusses current intellectual (and organizational) issues in the study of generative grammar. The GLOW name originally stood for "Generative Linguistics in the Old World."

It was founded in an attempt to provide an annual meeting for European researchers in Generative Grammar who felt themselves largely excluded from other organizations in the late 1970s.  Its founding document, the so-called GLOW Manifesto authored by Jan Koster, Henk van Riemsdijk and Jean-Roger Vergnaud, declared that "generative linguistics acquired a new momentum in Europe after Chomsky's [1973 paper] 'Conditions on transformations'" and sought to reflect that momentum with a new organization.  

By the beginning of the 21st century, GLOW had emerged as one of the leading organizations in linguistics internationally, as well as in Europe.  "Sister conferences" to the annual GLOW meeting in Europe have been organized under the rubric "GLOW Asia" in Japan, Korea and India, and the European GLOW conference itself has travelled as far south as Morocco (and as far north as Tromsø).  The 2015 Colloquium was held in Paris, the 2016 meeting took place Göttingen, in 2017 Leiden was the host, in 2018 Budapest, in 2019 Oslo.

External links
GLOW home page
GLOW manifesto

Linguistic societies
Academic conferences
Scientific organizations based in Europe